Bullitt is a 1968 American neo-noir action thriller film directed by Peter Yates and produced by Philip D'Antoni. The picture stars Steve McQueen, Robert Vaughn, and Jacqueline Bisset. The screenplay by Alan R. Trustman and Harry Kleiner was based on the 1963 novel Mute Witness, by Robert L. Fish, writing under the pseudonym Robert L. Pike. Lalo Schifrin wrote the original jazz-inspired score.

The film was made by McQueen's Solar Productions company, with his partner Robert Relyea as executive producer. Released by Warner Bros.-Seven Arts on October 17, 1968, the film was a critical and box-office success, later winning the Academy Award for Best Film Editing (Frank P. Keller) and receiving a nomination for Best Sound. Writers Trustman and Kleiner won a 1969 Edgar Award from the Mystery Writers of America for Best Motion Picture Screenplay. Bullitt is famous for its car chase scene through the streets of San Francisco, which is regarded as one of the most influential in film history.

In 2007, Bullitt was selected for preservation in the United States National Film Registry by the Library of Congress, as "culturally, historically, or aesthetically significant".

Plot 
On a Friday night in Chicago mobster Johnny Ross flees the Outfit. The next morning SFPD detective Lieutenant Frank Bullitt and his team, Delgetti and Stanton, are tasked by Walter Chalmers with guarding Ross over the weekend, until he can be presented as a witness to a Senate subcommittee hearing on organized crime on Monday morning. The detectives are told he is in a cheap hotel on Embarcadero. Delgetti will take the first shift, then Stanton and then Bullitt. At 1am Sunday, while Stanton is phoning Bullitt to say Chalmers and a friend want to come up, Ross unchains the room door. Two hitmen burst in shooting Stanton in the leg and Ross in the shoulder.

Chalmers holds Bullitt responsible for the injuries to Ross. Bullitt thwarts a second assassination attempt at the hospital, but Ross dies from his earlier wounds. Bullitt sends the body to the morgue as a John Doe in order to conceal the death and keep his investigation open. An informant says that the scuttlebutt is that Ross is alive and in town trying to flee the country because he stole a fortune from the mob. Bullitt learns that Ross made a long distance phone call to a hotel in San Mateo.

While driving his Ford Mustang, Bullitt becomes aware he is being followed by a Dodge Charger driven by the two hitmen. An extended chase ensues, through the streets of San Francisco and on to Brisbane, where the Dodge crashes off the road, killing its occupants in a fiery explosion.

On Sunday, Chalmers stops Captain Sam Bennett outside the family church and served him with a writ of habeas corpus for Ross. Bennett confronts Bullitt and Delgetti in the presence of SFPD Captain Baker, who wants Chalmers' support for the department. Bullitt reveals that Ross died. Bennett decides to wait until Monday and lets Bullitt investigate the long distance phone call to San Mateo. Bullitt gets a ride from his girlfriend, Cathy. At the hotel, Bullitt finds a woman garrotted in her room. Cathy, who has followed him, is left horrified by the scene. On the way back to San Francisco, she confronts Bullitt about his work saying "Frank, you live in a sewer" and wondering "What will happen to us?"

While examining the victim's luggage, Bullitt and Delgetti discover a travel brochure for Rome and traveler's checks made out to an Albert and Dorothy Renick. Bullitt requests their passport applications from Chicago. Bullitt, Captain Bennett, Chalmers and Captain Baker gather in the office with the telecopier as Albert Renick's application arrives. “You sent us to guard the wrong man,” Bullitt tells Chalmers. Ross used Renick, a used car salesman from Chicago, to elude both the mob and Chalmers. Bullitt realizes that Ross must be escaping the country that night, using the flight booked for Renick.

At San Francisco International Airport, Delgetti and Bullitt watch the Rome gate. However, Ross (now using Renick's passport) has switched to an earlier London flight. The plane is ordered to return to the terminal. Chalmers suggests to Bullitt   that the situation can be exploited to benefit both of them. “Bullshit”, Bullitt replies. 

Bullitt boards the plane as passengers are disembarking, but Ross escapes through the rear cabin door and flees across the runway, through taxiing aircraft to the crowded terminal, pursued by Bullitt. At the exit, Ross kills a deputy sheriff and is shot dead by Bullitt. Chalmers drives away in his limousine, its bumper sticker reads, “Support Your Local Police.”

Early Monday morning, Bullitt comes home to find Cathy asleep in his bed. She has chosen to stay.

Cast

 Steve McQueen as Lt. Frank Bullitt
 Don Gordon as Detective "Dell" Delgetti
 Robert Vaughn as Walter Chalmers
 Simon Oakland as Captain Sam Bennett
 Felice Orlandi as Albert "Johnny Ross" Renick
 Pat Renella as Johnny Ross
 Jacqueline Bisset as Cathy
 Carl Reindel as Carl Stanton
 Paul Genge as Mike, The Hitman
 Bill Hickman as Phil, The Hitman's Partner
 Robert Duvall as Weissberg (cab driver)
 Norman Fell as Captain Baker
 Georg Stanford Brown as Dr. Willard
 Justin Tarr as Eddy the Informant
 Al Checco as Desk Clerk
 Victor Tayback as Pete Ross
 Robert Lipton as Chalmers' 1st Aide
 Ed Peck as Westcott (reporter at hospital)
 John Aprea as Killer

Production
Bullitt was co-produced by McQueen's Solar Productions and Warner Bros.-Seven Arts, the film pitched to Jack L. Warner as "doing authority differently".

Development
Bullitt was director Yates's first American film. He was hired after McQueen saw his 1967 UK feature Robbery, with its extended car chase.  Joe Levine, whose Embassy Pictures had distributed Robbery, did not much like the film, but Alan Trustman, who saw the picture the very week he was writing the Bullitt chase scenes, insisted that McQueen, Relyea, and D'Antoni (none of whom had ever heard of Yates) see Robbery and consider Yates as director for Bullitt.

Casting
McQueen based the character of Frank Bullitt on San Francisco Inspector Dave Toschi, with whom he worked prior to filming. McQueen even copied Toschi's unique "fast-draw" shoulder holster. Toschi later became famous, along with Inspector Bill Armstrong, as the lead San Francisco investigators of the Zodiac Killer murders that began shortly after the release of Bullitt. Toschi is played by Mark Ruffalo in the film Zodiac, in which Paul Avery (Robert Downey Jr.) mentions that "McQueen got the idea for the holster from Toschi." Katharine Ross was offered the role of Cathy but turned it down as she felt that the part was just too small.

Realism 
Bullitt is notable for its extensive use of actual locations rather than studio sets, and its attention to procedural detail, from police evidence processing to emergency-room procedures. Director Yates' use of the new lightweight Arriflex cameras allowed for greater flexibility in location shooting. The film was shot entirely on location in San Francisco. In the emergency room operation scene, real doctors and nurses were used as the supporting cast. According to McQueen, "The thing we tried to achieve was not to do a theatrical film, but a film about reality."

Car chase

At the time of the film's release, the exciting car chase scenes, featuring McQueen at the wheel in all driver-visual scenes, generated prodigious excitement. Leonard Maltin has called it a "now-classic car chase, one of the screen's all-time best." Emanuel Levy wrote in 2003 that "Bullitt contains one of the most exciting car chases in film history, a sequence that revolutionized Hollywood's standards." In his obituary for Peter Yates, Bruce Weber wrote, "Mr. Yates' reputation probably rests most securely on Bullitt (1968), his first American film – and indeed, on one particular scene, an extended car chase that instantly became a classic."

Filming
The chase scene starts at 1:05:00 into the film. The total time of the scene is 10 minutes and 53 seconds. It begins under Highway 101 in the city's Mission District, as Bullitt spots the hitmen's car. It ends outside the city, at the Brisbane exit of the Guadalupe Canyon Parkway on San Bruno Mountain. Shooting occurred over a period of weeks. The chase sequence combined several locations, located miles apart and edited together. Mapping the movie route shows that it is not continuous and is impossible to follow in real time.

Two 1968 390 cu. in. V8 Ford Mustang GT Fastbacks (325 hp) with four-speed manual transmissions were purchased by Warner Bros. for the film. The Mustangs' engines, brakes and suspensions were heavily modified for the chase by veteran car racer and technician Max Balchowsky. In 2020, one of the fastbacks was sold at Mecum Auctions for a record price of $3.7 million. Ford Motor Company originally lent two Galaxie sedans for the chase scenes, but the producers found the cars too heavy for the jumps over the hills of San Francisco and also a Ford-Ford battle would not be believable on screen. They were replaced with two 1968 375-hp 440 Magnum V8-powered Dodge Chargers. The engines in both Dodge Charger models were left largely unmodified, but the suspensions were mildly upgraded to cope with the demands of the stunt work.

Driver's point-of-view shots were used to give the audience a participant's feel of the chase. Filming took three weeks, resulting in 9 minutes and 42 seconds of pursuit. Multiple takes were spliced into a single end product resulting in discontinuity: heavy damage on the passenger side of Bullitt's car can be seen much earlier than the incident producing it, and the Charger appears to lose five wheel covers, with different ones missing in different shots. Shooting from multiple angles simultaneously and creating a montage from the footage to give the illusion of different streets also resulted in the speeding cars passing the same vehicles at several different times, including, as widely noted, a green Volkswagen Beetle. In one scene, the Charger crashes into the camera; the damaged front fender is noticeable in later scenes. Local authorities did not allow the car chase to be filmed on the Golden Gate Bridge, but did permit it in Midtown locations including Bernal Heights and the Mission District, and on the outskirts of neighboring Brisbane.

McQueen, at the time a world-class race-car driver, drove in the close-up scenes, while stunt coordinator Carey Loftin, stuntman and motorcycle racer Bud Ekins, and McQueen's usual stunt driver, Loren Janes, drove for the high-speed parts of the chase and performed other dangerous stunts. Ekins, who doubled for McQueen in The Great Escape sequence where McQueen's character jumps over a barbed-wire fence on a motorcycle, performs a lowsider crash stunt in front of a skidding truck during the Bullitt chase. The Mustang's interior rearview mirror goes up and down depending on who is driving: when the mirror is up, McQueen is visible behind the wheel, when it is down, a stunt man is driving.

The black Dodge Charger was driven by veteran stunt driver Bill Hickman, who played one of the hitmen and helped with the chase scene choreography. The other hitman was played by Paul Genge, who played a character who had ridden a Dodge off the road to his death in an episode of Perry Mason ("The Case of the Sausalito Sunrise") two years earlier. In a magazine article many years later, one of the drivers involved in the chase sequence remarked that the Charger - with a larger engine (big-block 440 cu. in. versus the 390 cu. in.) and greater horsepower (375 versus 325) - was so much faster than the Mustang that the drivers had to keep backing off the accelerator to prevent the Charger from pulling away from the Mustang.

Editing
The editing of the car chase likely won Frank P. Keller the editing Oscar for 1968, and has been included in lists of the "Best Editing Sequences of All-Time". Paul Monaco has written, "The most compelling street footage of 1968, however, appeared in an entirely contrived sequence, with nary a hint of documentary feel about it – the car chase through the streets of San Francisco in Bullitt, created from footage shot over nearly five weeks. Billy Fraker, the cinematographer for the film, attributed the success of the chase sequence primarily to the work of the editor, Frank P. Keller. At the time, Keller was credited with cutting the piece in such a superb manner that he made the city of San Francisco a "character" in the film." The editing of the scene was not without difficulties; Ralph Rosenblum wrote in 1979 that "those who care about such things may know that during the filming of the climactic chase scene in Bullitt, an out-of-control car filled with dummies tripped a wire which prematurely sent a costly set up in flames, and that editor Frank Keller salvaged the near-catastrophe with a clever and unusual juxtaposition of images that made the explosion appear to go off on time." This chase scene has also been cited by critics as groundbreaking in its realism and originality.

Music

The original score was composed by Lalo Schifrin to track the various moods and the action of the film, with Schifrin's signature contemporary American jazz style. The tracks on the soundtrack album are alternate versions of those heard in the film, re-recorded by Schifrin with leading jazz musicians, including Bud Shank (flute), Carol Kaye (electric bass), Ray Brown (bass), Howard Roberts (guitar), and Larry Bunker (drums).

In 2000, the original arrangements as heard in the movie were recreated by Schifrin in a recording session with the WDR Big Band in Cologne, Germany, and released on the Aleph label. This release also includes re-recordings of the 1968 soundtrack album arrangements for some tracks.

In 2009, the never-before-released original recording of the score heard in the movie, recorded by Schifrin on the Warner Bros. scoring stage with engineer Dan Wallin, was made available by Film Score Monthly. Some score passages and cues are virtually identical to the official soundtrack album, while many softer, moodier cues from the film were not chosen or had been rewritten for the soundtrack release. Also included are additional cues that were not used in the film. In addition, the two-CD set features the official soundtrack album, newly mixed from the 1" master tape.

In the restaurant scene with McQueen and Bissett, the live band playing in the background is Meridian West, a jazz quartet that McQueen had seen performing at The Trident, a famous restaurant in Sausalito.

Reception
Bullitt garnered both critical acclaim and box-office success.

Box office
The film opened at Radio City Music Hall in New York City on Thursday, October 17, 1968, together with a new stage show. It grossed $210,000 in its first week, including a hall-record Saturday of $49,073. Produced on a $5.5 million budget, the film grossed $19 million in 1968, making it the fourth-highest-grossing film that year, and over $42.3 million in the US through 2021.

Critical response
Bullitt was well received by critics, and is considered by some to be one of the best films of 1968. At the time, Renata Adler made the film a New York Times Critics' Pick, calling it a "terrific movie, just right for Steve McQueen –-fast, well acted, written the way people talk." According to Adler, "the ending should satisfy fans from Dragnet to Camus."

In 2004, The New York Times placed the film on its list of the Best 1,000 Movies Ever Made. In 2011, Time listed it among the 15 Greatest Movie Car Chases of All Time, describing it as "the one, the first, the granddaddy, the chase on the top of almost every list", and saying "Bullitts car chase is a reminder that every great such scene is a triumph of editing as much as it is stunt work. Naturally, it won that year's Academy Award for Best Editing". Among 21st-century critics, it holds a 98% approval rating on Rotten Tomatoes, representing positive reviews from 40 of 41 critics with an average rating of 7.8/10. The website's critical consensus reads: "Steve McQueen is cool as ice in this thrilling police procedural that also happens to contain the arguably greatest car chase ever." On Metacritic the film has a score of 81 out of 100 based on reviews from 20 critics, indicating "Universal acclaim".

Awards and honours

The film was nominated for and won several critical awards. Frank P. Keller won the 1969 Academy Award for Best Film Editing, and it was also nominated for Best Sound. Five nominations at the BAFTA Film Awards for 1969 included Best Director for Peter Yates, Best Supporting Actor for Robert Vaughn, Best Cinematography for William A. Fraker, Best Film Editing for Frank P. Keller, and Best Sound Track. Robert Fish, Harry Kleiner, and Alan Trustman won the 1969 Edgar Award for Best Motion Picture. Keller won the American Cinema Editors Eddie Award for Best Edited Feature Film. The film also received the National Society of Film Critics Award for Best Cinematography (William A. Fraker) and the Golden Reel Award for Best Sound Editing – Feature Film. It was successful at the 1970 Laurel Awards, winning Golden Laurel awards for Best Action Drama, Best Action Performance (Steve McQueen) and Best Female New Face (Jacqueline Bisset). In 2000, the Society of Camera Operators awarded Bullitt its "Historical Shot" award to David M. Walsh.

Legacy
The famous car chase was later spoofed in Peter Bogdanovich's screwball comedy film What's Up, Doc?, the Clint Eastwood film The Dead Pool, in the Futurama episode "Bendin' in the Wind", and in the Archer season-six episode "The Kanes". The car chase can be seen playing on the screen in the drive-in theater scene in the 2014 film, Need for Speed. The 13th episode of TV series Alcatraz includes a recreation of the chase scene, with newer models of the Mustang and Charger. Bullitt producer Philip D'Antoni went on to film two more car chases, for The French Connection and The Seven-Ups, both set and shot in New York City.  "The Bullitt Mustang" was Season 6 Episode 7 of Blue Bloods, where the car was central to a plot involving its theft.

The Ford Mustang name has been closely associated with the film. In 2001, the Ford Motor Company released the Bullitt edition Ford Mustang GT. Another version of the Ford Mustang Bullitt, which is closer to resembling the original film Mustang, was released in 2008, to commemorate the 40th anniversary of the film. A third version was released in 2018 for the 2019 and 2020 model years. In 2009, Bud Brutsman of Overhaulin' built an authentic-looking replica of the Bullitt Mustang, fully loaded with modern components, for the five-episode 2009 TV series, Celebrity Rides: Hollywood's Speeding Bullitt, hosted by Chad McQueen, son of Steve McQueen.

The Mustang is featured in the 2003 video game Ford Racing 2, in a drafting challenge, on a course named Port Side. It appears in the Movie Stars category, along with other famous cars such as the Ford Torino from Starsky & Hutch and the Ford Mustang Mach 1 from Diamonds Are Forever. In the 2011 video game, Driver: San Francisco, the "Bite the Bullet" mission is based on the famous chase scene, with licensed versions of the Mustang and Charger from the film.

Steve McQueen's likeness as Frank Bullitt was used in two Ford commercials. The first was for the Europe-only 1997 Ford Puma, which featured a special-effects montage of McQueen (who died in 1980) driving a new Puma around San Francisco before parking it in a studio apartment garage beside the film Mustang and the motorcycle from The Great Escape. In a 2004 commercial for the 2005 Mustang, special effects are again used to create the illusion of McQueen driving the new Mustang, after a man receives a Field of Dreams-style epiphany and constructs a racetrack in the middle of a cornfield.

Several items of clothing worn by McQueen's Bullitt received a boost in popularity thanks to the film: desert boots, a trench coat, a blue turtleneck sweater, and most famously, a brown tweed jacket with elbow patches.

In February 2022, it was announced that Steven Spielberg would be directing and producing a new film centered on the Frank Bullitt character for Warner Bros. Pictures, with Josh Singer writing the screenplay. The film will be an original story, not a remake of the original film. Chad McQueen and niece Molly McQueen (son and granddaughter of Steve), will be executive producers. In November 2022, Bradley Cooper was cast as Frank Bullitt.

Mustangs 

Warner Bros. ordered two identical 1968 Mustangs for filming. Both were painted Highland Green and had the GT package with 390 CID engines. These cars had the sequential vehicle identification numbers 8R02S125558 and 8R02S125559. Prior to filming, the cars were modified by Max Balchowsky. Car '558 was used for the harsher driving (including the skid at the end of the chase), while '559 was used for lighter driving.

After the filming was complete, '559 was sold to Robert Ross, who in turn sold the car in 1970 to Frank Marranca. In 1974 Marranca sold the car to Robert Kiernan through an advertisement in Road & Track. The Kiernans used it as a family vehicle before placing it in storage in 1980. In 1977, McQueen attempted to buy it back, but was refused. Kiernan's son, Sean, began to restore the car in 2014, and had it authenticated in 2016, with documentation that included McQueen's letter offering to purchase it. On January 10, 2020, the car was sold by Mecum Auctions for $3.7 million to an unidentified buyer. The sale made it the most expensive Ford in the world.

Car '558 had been damaged severely during filming and was subsequently sent to a scrapyard. In the ensuing decades,  the car was assumed to be lost. In 2016, though, Hugo Sanchez purchased a pair of Mustang coupés from the backyard of a house near Los Cabos, Mexico. He then sent the cars to Ralph Garcia to start work on turning one into a clone of the Eleanor Mustang from the movie, Gone in 60 Seconds. Realizing one of the two Mustangs was an S-code, Garcia had the car authenticated by Kevin Marti. The authentication revealed this to be the lost Bullitt car. Sanchez and Garcia are now in the process of giving the car a full restoration.

See also
 List of American films of 1968

References

Sources

External links

 
 
 Bullitt at Box Office Mojo
 
 
 
 
 
 Feinstein Shoots McQueen

1968 films
1960s chase films
1960s crime thriller films
1960s action drama films
American action thriller films
American chase films
American crime thriller films
American action drama films
American crime drama films
Edgar Award-winning works
Fictional portrayals of the San Francisco Police Department
Films about automobiles
Films about murderers
Films based on American novels
Films based on crime novels
Films directed by Peter Yates
Films set in San Francisco
Films shot in San Francisco
Films whose editor won the Best Film Editing Academy Award
Ford Mustang
American police detective films
United States National Film Registry films
Warner Bros. films
Films scored by Lalo Schifrin
1968 drama films
Films with screenplays by Harry Kleiner
1960s English-language films
1960s American films